Houston Davis (born William Houston Davis; December 15, 1914 – November 15, 1987) was an American composer, arranger, teacher of music, dance band drummer, and later in his career, a justice of the peace in Hinds County, Mississippi.

Career

Growing up and early career 
As a child, Davis was born and raised in Tahlequah, Oklahoma. His father, Edward Samuel Davis (1874–1952) was a barber. Davis played snare drum in a community marching band in Tahlequah, Oklahoma. His father played bass horn.  Davis went on to study music at Northeastern State University in Tahlequah, Oklahoma (his photo is in the university's 1935 yearbook). During college, Davis also led his own dance band. Northeastern's music faculty included Henri S. Minsky (1908–1980), a violinist who was director of bands.

Around 1936, Davis began playing drums with the Wally Stoefler Orchestra, and stayed with the group until about 1940. Stoefler's press releases often singled out Davis as "that famous Oklahoma drummer."  At some point in his career, he then taught high school music and band.

Davis moved to Mississippi in 1942. In the latter 1950s, he wrote a number of political songs, but, was mostly composer and arranger for hire, as was advertised in a brochure published around 1960:

Songwriting career 
Davis wrote campaign songs for Mississippi Governors Ross Barnett and Paul Johnson. He composed "Go, Mississippi", which, in 1962, became the official state song for Mississippi. He also composed country songs, such as "I'm Broke", "Girls Don't Wear Dresses Anymore", and "Crop Duster".

Non-music career 
 In 1972, Davis was elected justice of the peace in Hinds County, Mississippi.
 Davis ran as an independent for mayor of Jackson, losing to Russell Carlos Davis (1922–1993), a Democrat, in the June 5, 1973, general election. Russell Davis was mayor of Jackson from 1969 to 1977.
 He wrote fiction for a national magazine.

National recognition 
 July 15, 1933: Ripley's Believe It or Not!, Davis received recognition for having held a drum roll in 1938 for 6 hours, 30 minutes, 20 seconds. The former record had been set by a member of Sousa's band.
 Davis was admitted to ASCAP in 1965.

Selected works 
 Sheet music

 "Caracas"
 R.S. Ricketts (words)
 William Houston Davis (music)
 © Ruby Stroud Ricketts, Mount Olive, Miss.
 15 June 1947; EU80333
 (unpublished)

 "Got a Rock In My Shoe"
 R.S. Ricketts (words)
 William Houston Davis (music)
 © Ruby Stroud Ricketts, Mount Olive, Miss.
 15 June 1947; EU80332
 (unpublished)

 "I Wonder How Much You Love Me"
 R.S. Ricketts (words)
 William Houston Davis (music)
 © Ruby Stroud Ricketts, Mount Olive, Miss.
 26 June 1947; EU81765
 (unpublished)

 "Put On The Coffee, Sarah"
 R.S. Ricketts (words)
 William Houston Davis (music)
 © Ruby Stroud Ricketts, Mount Olive, Miss.
 15 January 1947; EU80334
 (unpublished)

 "There's A Star Shining Bright"
 D. Bynum (words)
 William Houston Davis (music)
 © Dolly Bynum, Jackson, Miss.
 23 March 1947; EU67985
 (unpublished)

 "Yolanda and Joe"
 R.S. Ricketts (words)
 William Houston Davis (music)
 © Ruby Stroud Ricketts, Mount Olive, Miss.
 15 June 1947; EU80335
 (unpublished)

 "Rose of My Heart"
  James Vernal Fout & Houston Davis
 Delta Records, Jackson, Mississippi
 (custom recording)

 "I'm Sending You A Kiss On A Star"
 R.S. Ricketts (words)
 William Houston Davis (music)
 © w&m Ruby Stroud Ricketts, Mount Olive, Miss.
 October 1947; EU96063
 (unpublished)

 "Think Of You"
 William Houston Davis (arrangement)
 © m Leon Daniel
 10 September 1947; EUJ92147
 (unpublished)

 "A Tootin' Tune From A Hootin' Distance"
 William Houston Davis (music)
 © w Elma Brown Monroe
 28 September 1947; EU95446
 (unpublished)

 "Heartbreak"
 William Houston Davis (arrangement)
 Sadie Nordin Sallis (w&m)
 22 April 1949; EU164320
 (unpublished)

 "I Do, I Do, I Do"
 William Houston Davis (arrangement)
 © w & m Sadie Nordin Sallis
 25 March 1949; EUI61837
 (unpublished)

 "Sand Castles"
 William Houston Davis (arrangement)
 © w & m Sadie Nordin Sallis
 25 March 1949; EUI61836
 (unpublished)

 "That Cozy Little Cabin"
 William Houston Davis (arrangement)
 © w & m Sadie Nordin Sallis
 25 February 1949; EU158212
 (unpublished)

 "When God Made You"
 William Houston Davis (arrangement)
 © w & m Sadie Nordin Sallis
 21 April 1949; EU164819
 (unpublished)

 You Can't Hold His Hand While You Still Hold My Heart"
 William Houston Davis (arrangement)
 © w & m Sadie Nordin Sallis
 25 March 1949; EUI61838
 (unpublished)

 "I Want To Write A Song For The Hit Parade"
 William Houston Davis (music)
 © w Ruby Stroud Ricketts
 August 8, 1949; EU175503
 (unpublished)

 "I'll Be Blue, When I Paint The Town Red"
 Sadie Nordin Sallis (words)
 William Houston Davis & Jerry Lane (music)
 © Sadie Nordin Sallis & William Houston Davis
 July 17, 1950; EU209639
 (unpublished)

 "Gotta Go, Baby"
 Diamond Record Co., employer for hire
 of William Houston Davis
 © Diamond Record Co.
 January 7, 1952; EU260399
 (unpublished)

 "Go, Mississippi"
 In E major
 © Jackson Board of Realtors
 September 17, 1962; EP167366
 

 "Go, Mississippi"
 (manuscript)
 Houston Davis (w&m)
 © Jackson Board of Realtors
 September 17, 1962; EP167366
 

 "Roll With Ross, He's His Own Boss"
 W. Houston Davis (w&m)
 © Ross R. Barnett
 February 27, 1959; EU564630
 (unpublished)

 "Little Carrol's Last Stand"
 Houston Davis (w&m)
 © W.H. Davis
 New matter: new words
 August 12, 1959; EU589029
 (unpublished)

 "All I Want Is A Few Kind Words"
 Joseph Patrick Manley (words)
 Houston Davis & Sammy Graham (music)
 © Joseph Patrick Manley
 29 March 1954; EU352629
 (unpublished)

 "Baby Sitting"
 Marion J. LoPresto, Sr. (1919–1981) (words)
 Houston Davis (music)
 © Marion J. LoPresto, Sr., & Houston Davis
 23 Febreuar 1954; EU348672
 (unpublished)

 Eatin' High On The Hog"
 Ed Baker (words)
 William Houston Davis & Sammy Graham (music)
 © Ed Baker
 23 February 1954; EU348497
 (unpublished)

 "I Jes' Wanna Stay In Bed"
 Joseph Patrick Manley (word)
 Houston Davis & Sammy Graham (music)
 © Joseph Patrick Manley
 29 March 1954; EU352630
 (unpublished)

 "I Worry"
 Mrs. A. A. Kirkpatrick (words)
 Houston Davis & Sammy Graham (music)
 © Mrs. A. A. Kirkpatrick
 24 May 1954; EU359031
 (unpublished)

 "Share With Another"
 Robert Tipp Deel (word)
 Houston Davis & Sammy Graham (music)
 © Robert Tipp Deel
 27 May 1954; EU359600
 (unpublished)

 "Wife And Mother-In-Law
 Robert Tipp Deel (words)
 Houston Davis & Sammy Graham (music)
 © Robert Tipp Deel
 27 May 1954; EU359601
 (unpublished)

 "Asleep In Jesus"
 Effie Price Garrett (words)
 Sammy Graham & Houston Davis (music)
 © Effie Price Garrett
 8 November 1954l; EU376417
 (unpublished)

 "Bells"
 Mrs. A. A. Kirkpatrick (words)
 Houston Davis & Sammy Graham (music)
 © Mrs. A. A. Kirkpatrick
 30 December 1954; EU381296
 (unpublished)

 "Carren of Key West"
 Arlie S. Davis (words)
 Houston Davis & Sammy Graham (music)
 © Arlie S. Davis
 6 December 1954; EU379205
 (unpublished)

 "Oh! I Wish I Was"
 Mrs. A. A. Kirkpatrick (words)
 Houston Davis & Sammy Graham (music)
 © Mrs. A. A. KIrkpatrick
 11 October 1954; EU375983
 (unpublished)

 "How're You Feeling"
 Tom L. Spengler (w&m)
 William Houston Davis (arrangement)
 © Fielding L. Wright
 20 May 1955; EU398027
 (unpublished)

 "Silver Moon Waltz"
 Grace Irene Provins & Tex Stanley (words)
 Houston Davis & Sammy Graham (music)
 © Grace Irene Provins
 25 May 1955; EU398839
 (unpublished)

 "Southern Charm"
 Carrie Goyette Murray (words)
 Houston Davis & Sammy Graham (music)
 © Carrie Goyette Murray
 4 April 1955; EU392381
 (unpublished)

 "I Missed You In My Dreams Last Night"
 Robert Lane Almond (words)
 Houston Davis & Sammy Graham (music)
 © Robert Lane Almond
 l September 1955; EU408697
 (unpublished)

 There Ain't Gonna Be No Mason–Dixon line No More"
 Lola Davis Long (words)
 Lola Davis Long, employer for hire of Houston Davis & Sammy Graham
 © Lola Davis Long
 2 November 1955; EU4l6388
 (unpublished)

 "Big Bad Bee"
 Hazel Christine Nordan (words)
 Houston Davis (music)
 © Hazel Christine Nordan
 4 January 1956; EU421510
 (unpublished)

 "One Of These Days"
 Aline Marie Quarles (words)
 William Houston Davis & Sammy Graham
 © Aline Marie Quarles
 26 October 1956; EU454674
 (unpublished)

 "Add Another Heart To Your Collection"
 Florence Mandel (words)
 Houston Davis (music)
 © Florence Mandel
 20 November 1964; EU854383
 (unpublished)

 "All Mississippi Is For Your, Barry"
 Houston Davis (w&m)
 © Houston Davis
 6 October 1964; EU847101
 (unpublished)

 "Blue Mood"
 Grace Y. Ward (words)
 Houston Davis (music)
 2 p. © Grace Y. Ward
 8 December 1964; EU857121
 (unpublished)

 "Dirty Cotton Picking Machine"
 Hilary Lewis (w&m)
 Houston Davis (arrangement)
 2 p. © Hilary C. Lewis
 17 December 1964; EU858154
 (unpublished)

 "HR7152"
 Houston Davis,
 Davis
 13 July 1964; EU833962
 (unpublished)
 Note: H.R. 7152 is the Civil Right Act of 1964

 "I Can Never Be Lonesome"
 Gertrude Seaborn (words)
 Houston Davis (music)
 © Gertrude Seaborn
 16 July 1964; EU834988
 (unpublished)

 "I Love You"
 Ernest C. Rowell (words)
 Houston Davis (music)
 2 p. © Ernest C. Rowell
 13 August 1964; EU838949
 (unpublished)

 "I Will Always Whooop It Up For Mississippi"
 William D. Waugh (words)
 Houston Davis (music)
 © William D. Waugh & Houston Davis
 13 July 1964; EU833961
 (unpublished)

 "King Lyndon"
 Houston Davis (w&m)
 © Houston Davis
 3 September 1964; EU842366
 (unpublished)
 Note: Reference to LBJ

 "My Little Ole Door"
 J.L. Carter (words), pseudonym of Hilary C. Lewis
 Houston Davis (music)
 © Hilary C. Lewis
 6 November 1964; EU852324
 (unpublished)

 "1994"
 Houston Davis (w&m)
 © Houston Davis
 28 July 1964; EU836465
 (unpublished)

 "Sandy"
 Fred Maass, Jr. (words)
 Houston Davis Productions, Inc. (music)
 © Fred Maass, Jr.
 2 October 1964; EU846530
 (unpublished)

 "The South Bend Polka"
 Eve Rene Corle (words)
 Houston Davis (music)
 © Eve Rene Corle
 28 September 1964; EU846081
 (unpublished)

 "Springtime In Georgia"
 John B. Skipper (words)
 Houston Davis (music)
 © John B. Skipper
 13 November 1964; EU853297
 (unpublished)

Brief biographies of song collaborators 
 Tom L. Spengler, Jr., in 1957, was manager of Godwin Adv. Agency, Jackson, Mississippi
 Sammy Graham led a band in Mississippi
 Diamond Record Co., Inc., was an affiliate of Trumpet Records. Diamond was formed as Diamond Record Co., Inc., in 1950 when a white woman named Lillian McMurry and her husband Willard purchased a hardware store on Farish Street in Jackson, MS., then a location on the boundary between the city's white and black business and entertainment districts.

 Elmore James, Sonny Boy Williamson, Little Milton, and James Waller — all of these musical powerhouses furthered their recording careers at a little record company-label on once-thriving Farish Street, the historic black district of Jackson, Mississippi. These blues, gospel, and R&B all-stars are featured in Trumpet Records-Diamonds.

 Disambiguation
 Not to be confused with the New York company, Diamond Records, owned in 1947 by Irving Gwirtz.
 Not to be confused with the New York company, Diamond Records, founded in 1961 by former Roulette Records executive Joe Kolsky.

Selected discography 
Delta Recording Corp. recorded the original version of "Go, Mississippi" at its studio in Jackson, Mississippi, at 1653 Raymond Road. The label, which had an office in New York City in the early 1950s at 236 West 55th Street (Midtown Manhattan), was founded by Jim Bulleit (né James Albert Bulleit; 1908–1988) and Jimmie Ammons (né James Douglas Ammons; 1919–2001). Ammons's main occupation was that of a machinist in Jackson, Mississippi. Delta was noted for its custom recording work, which included recording weddings, church choirs, and college choirs. Delta also produced recordings for the foreign language department of Ole Miss. Delta also produced many jingles for numerous radio stations. Delta recorded radio stations all over Mississippi for ASCAP. When Mississippi was searching for a state song, Delta Recording Studio reportedly recorded all the state university bands in search of the song that would truly be representative of the state.

 Original recording

 Delta Records 133 (45 rpm) (released 1962)
 Governor Ross R. Barnett Campaign Souvenir: 1959 Campaign Songs
 Jerry Lane Orchestra, Maurice Thompson Singers ₳
 Houston Davis Productions, Inc.
 
 133-657: Side 1
"Go, Mississippi" (© 1962)
 Jerry Lane Orchestra
 Houston Davis (w&m)
 
 133-656: Side 2
<li>"Roll With Ross" (© 1959)
 (audio on YouTube)
 Houston Davis (w&m)
 Maurice Thompson Singers ₳
 Orchestra conducted by Jerry Lane ‡
 
"Little Carrol's Last Stand" (© 1959) †
 (audio on YouTube)
 Houston Davis (w&m)
 Maurice Thompson Singers ₳
 Orchestra conducted by Jerry Lane

 † The copyright for "Little Carrol's Last Stand" was previously registered as "The Battle of New Orleans."  "Little Carrol's Last Stand" was a political campaign attack song by commissioned by Ross Barnett against Lieutenant Governor Carroll Gartin in 1959. Barnett defeated Gartin to become Governor of Mississippi from 1960 to 1964.

 ‡ Jerry Lane was a dance band leader and trombonist from Jackson, Mississippi. Former band members include Tom "Bones" Malone.

 ₳ The Maurice Thompson Singers were a small vocal ensemble from Jackson, Mississippi, founded and conducted by S. Maurice Thompson (1903–1973). Thompson, a radio broadcast pioneer, had moved to Jackson in 1935 to be an announcer at WJDX. In the 1960s, he was the station manager for WLBT.

References

Catalog of Copyright Entries, Third Series, Music, Library of Congress, Copyright Office

General inline citations

1914 births
1987 deaths
American male composers
Songwriters from Oklahoma
American music educators
Musicians from Jackson, Mississippi
Songwriters from Mississippi
20th-century American composers
Northeastern State University alumni
20th-century American drummers
American male drummers
20th-century American male musicians
American male songwriters